head is a program on Unix and Unix-like operating systems used to display the beginning  of a text file or piped data.

Syntax
The command syntax is:

 head [options] <file_name>

By default, head will print the first 10 lines of its input to the standard output. The number of lines printed may be changed with a command line option. The following example shows the first 20 lines of filename:

 head -n 20 filename

This displays the first 5 lines of all files starting with foo:

 head -n 5 foo*

Most versions allow omitting n and instead directly specifying the number: -5. GNU head allows negative arguments for the -n option, meaning to print all but the last - argument value counted - lines of each input file.

Flags
 -c <x number of bytes> Copy first x number of bytes.

Other
Many early versions of Unix and Plan 9 did not have this command, and documentation and books used sed instead:

 sed 5q filename

The example prints every line (implicit) and quit after the fifth.

Implementations
A head command is also part of ASCII's MSX-DOS2 Tools for MSX-DOS version 2. The  command has also been ported to the IBM i operating system.

See also
tail (Unix)
dd (Unix)
List of Unix commands

References

External links

head manual page from GNU coreutils.
FreeBSD documentation for head

Unix text processing utilities
Unix SUS2008 utilities
IBM i Qshell commands